This is a list of notable alumni and faculty of University of the Pacific (United States).

Alumni

Academia
Arthur A. Dugoni, 1948 (DEN), dean of University of the Pacific School of Dentistry (1978-2006); served as president of the American Dental Association (1988-1989), American Dental Association Foundation; American Association of Dental Schools, and California Dental Association, and as treasurer of the Federation Dentaire Internationale FDI World Dental Federation.
William A. Finley, 1863 (non-graduate), first president of Oregon State University
Joseph Pomeroy Widney, 1863, second President of the University of Southern California (1891-1895), co-founder of the Church of the Nazarene

Business
Bob Bejan, 1982, Chief Development Officer of MSLGROUP
Joseph R. Knowland, 1895, politician; publisher of the Oakland Tribune newspaper
Alex Spanos, 1948, billionaire and owner of the San Diego Chargers
Dean Spanos, 1972, team president and CEO, San Diego Chargers

Entertainment
Alan Autry, 1975, actor, politician, and former National Football League (NFL) football player
Dave Brubeck, 1942, jazz pianist and founder of the Brubeck Institute
Dean Butler, 1979, television actor, producer
Robert Culp, 1949, actor
Jamie Lee Curtis, 1979 (non-graduate), actress
Doris Dörrie, 1975, German film director and producer
David Gerber, 1950, Golden Globe, Emmy and Peabody Award-winning TV producer/executive
Chris Isaak, 1980, actor and musician
Janet Leigh, 1947 (non-graduate), actress
Bridget Marquardt, 2000 (Master's degree in Comm.), Playboy Playmate; one of the stars of The Girls Next Door
Steve Martini, 1974 (JD), NY Times bestselling author of legal novels
Darren McGavin, 1948 (non-graduate), television and film actor
Joseph C. Phillips, (non-graduate), actor and conservative Christian
Jo Van Fleet, 1941, actress
Irene Roberts, 2006, mezzo-soprano with the Deutsche Opera Berlin

Government and politics
Greg Aghazarian, 1993 (JD), former California State Assemblyman
Duke Aiona, 1977, former Lieutenant Governor of Hawaii
Arif Alvi, 1984, President of Pakistan
Mark Amodei, 1983 (JD),  United States Representative for Nevada's second congressional district 
Alan Autry, 1975, former mayor of Fresno, California
Henry L. Benson, 1873, 44th Associate Justice of the Oregon Supreme Court
Frank W. Benson, 1877, 12th Governor of Oregon
Elwood Bruner, 1874, State Assembly member in the 1890s
Connie Callahan, 1975, Judge, Ninth U.S. Circuit Court of Appeals
Gustavus Cheyney Doane, 1861, U.S. Army, member of Washburn-Langford-Doane Expedition to Yellowstone in 1870
John Doolittle, 1978, United States House of Representatives
Morrison England, 1976, 1983 (JD), U.S. District Court Judge
Noreen Evans, 1971 (JD), California State Assemblywoman
John M. Gerrard, 1981 (JD), Nebraska Supreme Court
Mikayil Jabbarov, 1998 (JD), Minister of Education of the Azerbaijan Republic
Joseph R. Knowland, 1895 United States House of Representatives
Bill Lockyer, 1986E (JD), California Attorney General
Ronald O. Loveridge, 1960, former Mayor of Riverside, California
Mark Meckler, 1988 (JD), political activist
Robert T. Monagan, 1942, 55th speaker of California State Assembly
George Moscone, 1953, California state senator and former 37th Mayor of San Francisco
James C. Needham, 1886, U.S Representative from California 
Susan B. Neuman, 1978 (EdD), prominent literacy researcher, educator and author; US Assistant Secretary of Elementary and Secondary Education 2001–2003
Theodore Olson, 1962, lawyer and 42nd Solicitor General of the United States
Johnnie Rawlinson, 1979D (JD), Ninth U.S. Circuit Court of Appeals
Alfred E. Reames, 1891 (non-graduate), United States Senator
Vice Admiral Robert D. Sharp, 1985, Director of the National Geospatial-Intelligence Agency

Science and engineering
José M. Hernández, 1985, NASA astronaut
Steven Kistler, 1921 (non-graduate), inventor of Aerogel
George Tchobanoglous, 1958, professor of engineering at University of California, Davis

Sports
Bob Adams, 1969, former NFL tight end
Dick Bass, 1958, former Los Angeles Rams Pro Bowl running back
Ryan Benjamin, 1992, American football player
Greg Bishop, 1993, former NFL offensive tackle 1993–1999
Tristan Blackmon, 2017, professional soccer player for Los Angeles FC
Scott Boras, 1977, 1982 (JD), Major League Baseball agent
Don Campora, 1950, former American football offensive tackle for the San Francisco 49ers and the Washington Redskins
Pete Carroll, 1973, Super Bowl-winning coach of the Seattle Seahawks and former head football coach at the University of Southern California
Kyra Christmas, 2017, member of Canada women's national water polo team, competed in 2020 Summer Olympics
Clyde Conner, 1956, former professional football player for the San Francisco 49ers
Bruce Coslet, 1968, former NFL head coach for the New York Jets and Cincinnati Bengals
Heather Cox, 1992, former volleyball player, now ESPN sideline reporter & NBC Olympics reporter
Gene Cronin, 1956, former American football defensive end for the Detroit Lions, Washington Redskins, and the Dallas Cowboys
Dell Demps, 1992, 1998, former pro basketball player, now New Orleans Pelicans general manager
Tom Flores, 1958, retired Super Bowl-winning coach of the Oakland Raiders of the National Football League
Wayne Hardin, 1950, head football coach at the United States Naval Academy from 1959 to 1964
Willard Harrell, 1974, former NFL running back, Green Bay Packers, 1975–1977, St. Louis Cardinals, 1977–1984
Walt Harris, 1967, former head football coach at Stanford University and University of Pittsburgh
Wayne Hawkins, 1960, former AFL All-Star, Oakland Raiders
Willie Hector, 1961, former NFL player
Bob Heinz, 1969, former NFL defensive tackle, Miami Dolphins and Washington Redskins
D.J. Houlton, 2001, former pitcher for the Los Angeles Dodgers
Honor Jackson, 1971, former NFL safety
Hue Jackson, 1986, former NFL Head Coach of the Oakland Raiders and Cleveland Browns
Jennifer Joines, 2004, USA volleyball Olympian (2008)
Carl Kammerer, 1967, American football defensive end and linebacker, San Francisco 49ers and Washington Redskins 
Eddie LeBaron, 1950, former NFL football player and NFL executive
Bob Lee, 1967, former professional football player
Lionel Manuel, 1984 (non-graduate), former New York Giants wide receiver
Phil Martinovich, 1938, American football player
Mike Merriweather, 1982, Pittsburgh Steelers and Minnesota Vikings pro-bowl linebacker
John Nisby, 1957, former Pittsburgh Steelers and Washington Redskins offensive guard
Mark Nordquist, 1967, former NFL offensive guard
Elaina Oden, 1989, two-time Olympic volleyball player
Michael Olowokandi, 1998, former NBA player and 1st overall pick in 1998 NBA Draft
Stu Pederson, 1981 (non-graduate), former Major League Baseball player, Los Angeles Dodgers
Brian Peets, 1978, former NFL tight end
Shawn Price, 1993, former American football defensive end in the NFL for the Tampa Bay Buccaneers, Carolina Panthers, Buffalo Bills, and San Diego Chargers
Duane Putnam, 1952, former NFL Pro Bowl player
Greg Robinson, 1976, former NFL assistant coach and current Michigan Wolverines defensive coordinator
Bill Sandeman, 1965, former NFL offensive tackle, Atlanta Falcons
Brad Schumacher, 1997, 2005 (MBA), two-time Olympian (1996 swimming, 2000 water polo) and two-time Olympic gold medalist (1996 swimming)
Jane Swagerty, 1966, competitive swimmer and 1968 Olympic bronze medalist
Kevin Turner, 1980, former American football linebacker for the New York Giants, Washington Redskins, Seattle Seahawks, and the Cleveland Browns. 
Herm Urenda, 1960, former American football player  
Al Westover, 1976, former basketball player in the Australian National Basketball League
Craig Whelihan, 1995, former NFL, XFL and AFL quarterback
Roy Williams, 1962, former NFL defensive tackle

Others
S. G. Browne, 1989, author of dark comedy and social satire
Matt de la Peña, 1996, Newbery Medal-winning author, writer of children's books
Sharon Ito, 1982, Japanese-American newscaster
George Knapp, 1977, investigative journalist
Susanne Mentzer, 1976, operatic mezzo-soprano
Peter Morales, 1967, President of the Unitarian Universalist Association, 2009
Olive Oatman, 1857, Indian captive and lecturer

Notable coaches
Bill Anttila, the school's All-time winningest water polo coach, member of United States Water Polo Hall of Fame, charter member of the California Community College Water Polo Hall of Fame, member of Springfield College (MA) Hall of Fame 
Jon Gruden, former Pacific assistant football coach, later served as head coach of the NFL's Oakland Raiders, Tampa Bay Buccaneers and Las Vegas Raiders
Terry Liskevych, former 3-time Olympic women's volleyball head coach; Pacific's head coach from 1977–84
Buddy Ryan, former Pacific assistant football coach, former NFL head coach of the Philadelphia Eagles and Arizona Cardinals
Ed Sprague Jr., former Major League Baseball all-star; head baseball coach, 2004–2015
Amos Alonzo Stagg, "The Grand Old Man of Football", head football coach at Pacific from 1933–46
Damon Stoudamire, former Pacific head men's basketball coach, 2016-2021, 13-year NBA player and 1996 NBA Rookie of the Year
Bob Thomason, 1971, 5-time Big West Coach of the Year and school's all-time winningest men's basketball coach; Pacific's head coach from 1988–2013

Notable staff/faculty
Marisa Kelly, President of Suffolk University in Boston, Massachusetts
Anthony Kennedy, Associate Justice of the Supreme Court of the United States, teaches international and American law at the University of Salzburg for the McGeorge School of Law international program
Samuel Stephens Kistler, 1922, inventor of Aerogel, faculty member between 1923-1930
Heather Knight, former President of Pacific Union College

References

	

University of the Pacific people
List